Gus Seebeck (born 18 September 1977) is a former Australian rules footballer who played for  and  in the West Australian Football League/Westar Rules (WAFL), and the East Coast Eagles in the AFL Sydney.

Seebeck was a member of the Victorian Teal Cup winning side in 1994 and played for the Prahran Dragons in the TAC Cup, captaining them in 1995.  Of the 25 players in the Victorian side that year, 23 were drafted into the Australian Football League (AFL) in either the 1994 or 1995 AFL Draft, but Seebeck was overlooked.  He then moved to Perth and played reserves football for South Fremantle whilst he studied Aquaculture at Curtin University.  An abundance of tall players limited Seebeck's chance to play in the senior team and despite winning the Prendegast Medal in 1998 as the fairest and best player in the reserves competition, he only managed to play eleven senior games in three years.

The move was instantly successful, as he was a surprise winner of the 1999 Sandover Medal, beating favourite Ryan Turnbull by one vote. In 2000, however, with the host club arrangement disbanded, he returned to South Fremantle, but only played two games before being offered a job with the PGA Tour as Operations Manager for Australasia, which was based in Sydney. He had previously worked for the organising committee for the Heineken Open golf tournament when it was based in Perth.

He continued to play football in Sydney for the East Coast Eagles, and is their current chairman.

References

1977 births
Living people
Australian rules football administrators
Australian rules footballers from Victoria (Australia)
East Coast Eagles players
Sandringham Dragons players
Perth Football Club players
Sandover Medal winners
South Fremantle Football Club players